El Sargento is a Mexican cypress tree in Mexico City's park Chapultepec, planted by Nezahualcoyotl . After living for approximately 500 years, the tree died in 1969, and its trunk stands today at around 50 feet tall.

References

External links

 

Chapultepec
Individual trees in Mexico